The 1993 Toronto Blue Jays season was the franchise's 17th season of Major League Baseball. It resulted in the Blue Jays finishing first in the American League East with a record of 95 wins and 67 losses. They were shut out only once (on June 30th, by Fernando Valenzuela) in 162 regular-season games. The Blue Jays would repeat as World Champions and become the first back-to-back champions since the 1977–1978 New York Yankees. The American League Championship Series would see the Blue Jays play the Chicago White Sox. After defeating the White Sox in six games, the Blue Jays would beat the Philadelphia Phillies in the World Series, also in six games. The team would not qualify for the postseason again until the 2015 season.

This season marked the first time that a manager from the Blue Jays would manage the American League in the Major League Baseball All-Star Game. It was the 64th Mid-Summer Classic and was played on July 13 at Camden Yards in Baltimore with Cito Gaston leading the American League squad. John Olerud, Roberto Alomar, Joe Carter, and Paul Molitor were all starters for the American League. Pat Hentgen, Duane Ward and Devon White were named as reserves to the American League team. In the game, the American League defeated the National League by a score of 9–3. White, Alomar, Molitor, Carter and Olerud, batting first through fifth for most games, proved to be very strong offensively, and were nicknamed WAMCO. When Rickey Henderson joined the Jays on July 31, and was placed as the leadoff hitter, the nickname (now for the first six in the batting order) was then able to be spelled HWAMCO or HWACOM.

Offseason
October 26, 1992: Mike Maksudian was selected off waivers by the Minnesota Twins from the Toronto Blue Jays.
November 17, 1992: Dave Weathers was drafted by the Florida Marlins from the Toronto Blue Jays as the 29th pick in the 1992 expansion draft.
November 27, 1992: Darnell Coles was signed as a free agent with the Toronto Blue Jays.
December 7, 1992: Paul Molitor was signed as a free agent with the Toronto Blue Jays.
December 7, 1992: Billy Taylor was drafted by the Toronto Blue Jays from the Atlanta Braves in the 1992 rule 5 draft.
December 8, 1992: Dave Stewart was signed as a free agent with the Toronto Blue Jays.
December 8, 1992: Kelly Gruber was traded by the Toronto Blue Jays with cash to the California Angels for Luis Sojo.
December 8, 1992: Danny Cox was signed as a free agent with the Toronto Blue Jays.
January 6, 1993: Mark Eichhorn was signed as a free agent with the Toronto Blue Jays. 
January 15, 1993: Dick Schofield was signed as a free agent with the Toronto Blue Jays.
 March 30, 1993: The Toronto Blue Jays traded Derek Bell to the San Diego Padres in exchange for Darrin Jackson.
 March 30, 1993: The Toronto Blue Jays released David Wells.

Spring training
The Toronto Blue Jays spent their 17th spring training at Dunedin, Florida, while playing their home exhibition games at Dunedin Stadium at Grant Field for the 4th Spring training season.

Regular season

Season standings

Record vs. opponents

Roster

Transactions
April 3, 1993: Billy Taylor was returned (earlier draft pick) by the Toronto Blue Jays to the Atlanta Braves.
April 13, 1993: Willie Canate was purchased by the Toronto Blue Jays from the Cincinnati Reds.
April 15, 1993: Ken Dayley was released by the Toronto Blue Jays.
April 25, 1993: Scott Bailes was signed as a free agent with the Toronto Blue Jays.
June 3, 1993: Chris Carpenter was drafted by the Toronto Blue Jays in the 1st round (15th pick) of the 1993 amateur draft. Player signed August 10, 1993.
June 11, 1993: Tony Fernandez was traded by the New York Mets to the Toronto Blue Jays for Darrin Jackson.
June 17, 1993: Doug Linton was selected off waivers by the California Angels from the Toronto Blue Jays.
July 31, 1993: Rickey Henderson was traded by the Oakland Athletics to the Toronto Blue Jays for a player to be named later and Steve Karsay. The Toronto Blue Jays sent Jose Herrera (August 6, 1993) to the Oakland Athletics to complete the trade.
August 12, 1993: Randy St. Claire was signed as a free agent with the Toronto Blue Jays.

Game log

|-  style="text-align:center; background:#fbb;"
| 1 || April 6 || @ Mariners || 1–8 || Johnson (1–0) || Morris (0–1) || || Kingdome || 56,120 || 0–1 || L1
|-  style="text-align:center; background:#bfb;"
| 2 || April 7 || @ Mariners || 2–0 || Leiter (1–0) || Bosio (0–1) || Ward (1) || Kingdome || 27,837 || 1–1 || W1
|-  style="text-align:center; background:#bfb;"
| 3 || April 9 || Indians || 13–10 || Eichhorn (1–0) || Power (0–1) || Ward (2) || SkyDome || 50,533 || 2–1 || W2
|-  style="text-align:center; background:#bfb;"
| 4 || April 10 || Indians || 5–4 || Stottlemyre (1–0) || Nagy (0–2) || Ward (3) || SkyDome || 50,492 || 3–1 || W3
|-  style="text-align:center; background:#fbb;"
| 5 || April 11 || Indians || 6–10 || Clark (1–0) || Morris (0–2) || Lilliquist (2) || SkyDome || 47,194 || 3–2 || L1
|-  style="text-align:center; background:#bfb;"
| 6 || April 13 || Mariners || 6–5 || Cox (1–0) || Leary (0–1) || Ward (4) || SkyDome || 42,230 || 4–2 || W1
|-  style="text-align:center; background:#fbb;"
| 7 || April 14 || Mariners || 9–10 (10) || DeLucia (1–0) || Hentgen (0–1) || Charlton (1) || SkyDome || 43,054 || 4–3 || L1
|-  style="text-align:center; background:#bfb;"
| 8 || April 15 || Mariners || 3–1 || Stottlemyre (2–0) || Cummings (0–2) || Ward (5) || SkyDome || 46,272 || 5–3 || W1
|-  style="text-align:center; background:#fbb;"
| 9 || April 16 || @ Indians || 1–13 || Nagy (1–2) || Morris (0–3) || || Cleveland Stadium || 17,428 || 5–4 || L1
|-  style="text-align:center; background:#bfb;"
| 10 || April 17 || @ Indians || 8–1 || Hentgen (1–1) || Clark (1–1) || || Cleveland Stadium || 21,755 || 6–4 || W1
|-  style="text-align:center; background:#fbb;"
| 11 || April 18 || @ Indians || 5–6 || Mutis (1–1) || Leiter (1–1) || Lilliquist (3) || Cleveland Stadium || 24,368 || 6–5 || L1
|-  style="text-align:center; background:#bfb;"
| 12 || April 19 || @ Indians || 7–1 || Guzmán (1–0) || Bielecki (1–2) || || Cleveland Stadium || 11,750 || 7–5 || W1
|-  style="text-align:center; background:#fbb;"
| 13 || April 20 || @ Royals || 2–8 || Appier (1–2) || Stottlemyre (2–1) || || Royals Stadium || 14,985 || 7–6 || L1
|-  style="text-align:center; background:#fbb;"
| 14 || April 21 || @ Royals || 5–6 || Montgomery (1–0) || Timlin (0–1) || || Royals Stadium || 15,693 || 7–7 || L2
|-  style="text-align:center; background:#bfb;"
| 15 || April 22 || @ Royals || 6–3 || Hentgen (2–1) || Cone (0–4) || || Royals Stadium || 19,369 || 8–7 || W1
|-  style="text-align:center; background:#fbb;"
| 16 || April 23 || White Sox || 4–5 || McCaskill (1–2) || Leiter (1–2) || Hernández (3) || SkyDome || 50,494 || 8–8 || L1
|-  style="text-align:center; background:#bfb;"
| 17 || April 24 || White Sox || 10–4 || Guzmán (2–0) || Bolton (0–3) || || SkyDome || 50,518 || 9–8 || W1
|-  style="text-align:center; background:#bfb;"
| 18 || April 25 || White Sox || 1–0 || Stottlemyre (3–1) || Fernandez (2–2) || Ward (6) || SkyDome || 50,430 || 10–8 || W2
|-  style="text-align:center; background:#bfb;"
| 19 || April 26 || Rangers || 8–6 || Morris (1–3) || Lefferts (1–4) || Ward (7) || SkyDome || 47,368 || 11–8 || W3
|-  style="text-align:center; background:#bfb;"
| 20 || April 27 || Rangers || 4–3 || Hentgen (3–1) || Nen (0–1) || Ward (8) || SkyDome || 49,021 || 12–8 || W4
|-  style="text-align:center; background:#fbb;"
| 21 || April 28 || Royals || 3–5 || Gardner (2–1) || Brow (0–1) || Montgomery (6) || SkyDome || 49,073 || 12–9 || L1
|-  style="text-align:center; background:#bfb;"
| 22 || April 29 || Royals || 8–0 || Guzmán (3–0) || Pichardo (1–1) || || SkyDome || 49,114 || 13–9 || W1
|-  style="text-align:center; background:#fbb;"
| 23 || April 30 || @ White Sox || 2–10 || Fernandez (3–2) || Stottlemyre (3–2) || || Comiskey Park || 29,497 || 13–10 || L1
|-

|-  style="text-align:center; background:#fbb;"
| 24 || May 1 || @ White Sox || 2–8 || Álvarez (2–0) || Morris (1–4) || || Comiskey Park || 35,378 || 13–11 || L2
|-  style="text-align:center; background:#bfb;"
| 25 || May 2 || @ White Sox || 6–1 || Hentgen (4–1) || McDowell (5–1) || Cox (1) || Comiskey Park || 25,715 || 14–11 || W1
|-  style="text-align:center; background:#fbb;"
| 26 || May 4 || @ Rangers || 2–3 || Bohanon (1–0) || Ward (0–1) || Henke (5) || Arlington Stadium || 20,354 || 14–12 || L1
|-  style="text-align:center; background:#fbb;"
| 27 || May 5 || @ Rangers || 1–7 || Rogers (3–1) || Stottlemyre (3–3) || || Arlington Stadium || 16,159 || 14–13 || L2
|-  style="text-align:center; background:#bfb;"
| 28 || May 6 || Orioles || 10–8 || Cox (2–0) || McDonald (2–3) || Ward (9) || SkyDome || 50,505 || 15–13 || W1
|-  style="text-align:center; background:#bfb;"
| 29 || May 7 || Orioles || 3–2 || Eichhorn (2–0) || Frohwirth (1–2) || || SkyDome || 50,498 || 16–13 || W2
|-  style="text-align:center; background:#fbb;"
| 30 || May 8 || Orioles || 3–6 || Sutcliffe (3–2) || Linton (0–1) || Frohwirth (2) || SkyDome || 50,507 || 16–14 || L1
|-  style="text-align:center; background:#fbb;"
| 31 || May 9 || Orioles || 3–4 || Williamson (1–1) || Ward (0–2) || Olson (6) || SkyDome || 50,473 || 16–15 || L2
|-  style="text-align:center; background:#fbb;"
| 32 || May 11 || Tigers || 7–12 || Gullickson (1–0) || Stottlemyre (3–4) || || SkyDome || 50,493 || 16–16 || L3
|-  style="text-align:center; background:#fbb;"
| 33 || May 12 || Tigers || 8–13 || Krueger (3–1) || Hentgen (4–2) || Henneman (7) || SkyDome || 50,488 || 16–17 || L4
|-  style="text-align:center; background:#bfb;"
| 34 || May 13 || Tigers || 6–5 || Castillo (1–0) || MacDonald (3–1) || || SkyDome || 50,507 || 17–17 || W1
|-  style="text-align:center; background:#bfb;"
| 35 || May 14 || @ Yankees || 8–6 || Ward (1–2) || Monteleone (3–3) || || Yankee Stadium || 27,733 || 18–17 || W2
|-  style="text-align:center; background:#fbb;"
| 36 || May 15 || @ Yankees || 3–4 || Pérez (2–2) || Leiter (1–3) || Farr (8) || Yankee Stadium || 31,372 || 18–18 || L1
|-  style="text-align:center; background:#bfb;"
| 37 || May 16 || @ Yankees || 12–6 || Stottlemyre (4–4) || Witt (2–1) || || Yankee Stadium || 31,583 || 19–18 || W1
|-  style="text-align:center; background:#bfb;"
| 38 || May 17 || @ Red Sox || 9–3 || Hentgen (5–2) || Clemens (5–3) || || Fenway Park || 30,057 || 20–18 || W2
|-  style="text-align:center; background:#bbb;"
| -- || May 18 || @ Red Sox ||colspan=8|Postponed (rain) Rescheduled for May 20
|-  style="text-align:center; background:#fbb;"
| 39 || May 19 || @ Red Sox || 5–10 || Darwin (4–4) || Stewart (0–1) || || Fenway Park || 27,465 || 20–19 || L1
|-  style="text-align:center; background:#bfb;"
| 40 || May 20 || @ Red Sox || 4–3 || Cox (3–0) || Quantrill (2–3) || Ward (10) || Fenway Park || 18,219 || 21–19 || W1
|-  style="text-align:center; background:#bfb;"
| 41 || May 21 || Twins || 11–2 || Morris (2–4) || Deshaies (5–3) || || SkyDome || 50,480 || 22–19 || W2
|-  style="text-align:center; background:#bfb;"
| 42 || May 22 || Twins || 7–0 || Cox (4–0) || Tapani (2–5) || || SkyDome || 50,510 || 23–19 || W3
|-  style="text-align:center; background:#bfb;"
| 43 || May 23 || Twins || 2–1 || Hentgen (6–2) || Erickson (2–6) || Ward (11) || SkyDome || 50,499 || 24–19 || W4
|-  style="text-align:center; background:#bfb;"
| 44 || May 24 || Brewers || 4–1 || Stewart (1–1) || Boddicker (3–3) || Ward (12) || SkyDome || 50,494 || 25–19 || W5
|-  style="text-align:center; background:#bfb;"
| 45 || May 25 || Brewers || 4–2 || Guzmán (4–0) || Wegman (3–7) || Ward (13) || SkyDome || 50,504 || 26–19 || W6
|-  style="text-align:center; background:#fbb;"
| 46 || May 26 || Brewers || 1–8 || Navarro (3–3) || Morris (2–5) || || SkyDome || 50,483 || 26–20 || L1
|-  style="text-align:center; background:#fbb;"
| 47 || May 27 || Brewers || 3–9 || Bones (2–2) || Leiter (1–4) || || SkyDome || 50,487 || 26–21 || L2
|-  style="text-align:center; background:#fbb;"
| 48 || May 28 || @ Athletics || 2–3 || Witt (5–2) || Cox (4–1) || Honeycutt (1) || Oakland–Alameda County Coliseum || 30,351 || 26–22 || L3
|-  style="text-align:center; background:#bfb;"
| 49 || May 29 || @ Athletics || 5–3 || Stewart (2–1) || Welch (4–4) || Ward (14) || Oakland–Alameda County Coliseum || 30,467 || 27–22 || W1
|-  style="text-align:center; background:#bfb;"
| 50 || May 30 || @ Athletics || 13–11 || Cox (5–1) || Mohler (0–1) || Ward (15) || Oakland–Alameda County Coliseum || 28,167 || 28–22 || W2
|-  style="text-align:center; background:#bfb;"
| 51 || May 31 || @ Angels || 10–5 || Morris (3–5) || Farrell (2–6) || || Anaheim Stadium || 30,620 || 29–22 || W3
|-

|-  style="text-align:center; background:#bfb;"
| 52 || June 1 || @ Angels || 8–0 || Leiter (2–4) || Sanderson (7–3) || || Anaheim Stadium || 18,198 || 30–22 || W4
|-  style="text-align:center; background:#bfb;"
| 53 || June 2 || @ Angels || 7–6 || Hentgen (7–2) || Valera (3–4) || Ward (16) || Anaheim Stadium || 24,360 || 31–22 || W5
|-  style="text-align:center; background:#bfb;"
| 54 || June 4 || Athletics || 4–3 (12) || Williams (1–0) || Gossage (3–2) || || SkyDome || 50,507 || 32–22 || W6
|-  style="text-align:center; background:#bfb;"
| 55 || June 5 || Athletics || 9–5 || Guzmán (5–0) || Hillegas (2–5) || || SkyDome || 50,514 || 33–22 || W7
|-  style="text-align:center; background:#fbb;"
| 56 || June 6 || Athletics || 3–10 || Darling (1–3) || Morris (3–6) || || SkyDome || 50,505 || 33–23 || L1
|-  style="text-align:center; background:#bfb;"
| 57 || June 7 || Angels || 4–2 || Leiter (3–4) || Sanderson (7–4) || Ward (17) || SkyDome || 49,177 || 34–23 || W1
|-  style="text-align:center; background:#bfb;"
| 58 || June 8 || Angels || 14–6 || Williams (2–0) || Valera (3–5) || || SkyDome || 49,112 || 35–23 || W2
|-  style="text-align:center; background:#fbb;"
| 59 || June 9 || Angels || 4–6 || Langston (7–1) || Stewart (2–2) || Frey (6) || SkyDome || 50,503 || 35–24 || L1
|-  style="text-align:center; background:#fbb;"
| 60 || June 10 || @ Tigers || 3–5 || Doherty (6–2) || Guzmán (5–1) || MacDonald (3) || Tiger Stadium || 27,551 || 35–25 || L2
|-  style="text-align:center; background:#fbb;"
| 61 || June 11 || @ Tigers || 1–6 || Gullickson (4–2) || Morris (3–7) || || Tiger Stadium || 39,654 || 35–26 || L3
|-  style="text-align:center; background:#fbb;"
| 62 || June 12 || @ Tigers || 1–12 || Moore (4–3) || Leiter (3–5) || || Tiger Stadium || 47,086 || 35–27 || L4
|-  style="text-align:center; background:#bfb;"
| 63 || June 13 || @ Tigers || 13–4 || Hentgen (8–2) || Leiter (6–2) || || Tiger Stadium || 44,032 || 36–27 || W1
|-  style="text-align:center; background:#fbb;"
| 64 || June 14 || @ Twins || 3–4 || Casian (1–0) || Cox (5–2) || Willis (1) || Hubert H. Humphrey Metrodome || 27,887 || 36–28 || L1
|-  style="text-align:center; background:#bfb;"
| 65 || June 15 || @ Twins || 6–3 || Guzmán (6–1) || Tapani (3–7) || Ward (18) || Hubert H. Humphrey Metrodome || 31,759 || 37–28 || W1
|-  style="text-align:center; background:#bfb;"
| 66 || June 16 || @ Twins || 4–0 || Morris (4–7) || Erickson (3–7) || || Hubert H. Humphrey Metrodome || 30,326 || 38–28 || W2
|-  style="text-align:center; background:#bfb;"
| 67 || June 17 || Red Sox || 7–0 || Leiter (4–5) || Quantrill (2–5) || || SkyDome || 50,528 || 39–28 || W3
|-  style="text-align:center; background:#bfb;"
| 68 || June 18 || Red Sox || 11–2 || Hentgen (9–2) || Clemens (7–6) || || SkyDome || 50,509 || 40–28 || W4
|-  style="text-align:center; background:#bfb;"
| 69 || June 19 || Red Sox || 9–4 || Stewart (3–2) || Darwin (5–7) || || SkyDome || 50,510 || 41–28 || W5
|-  style="text-align:center; background:#bfb;"
| 70 || June 20 || Red Sox || 3–2 (12) || Timlin (1–1) || Russell (0–1) || || SkyDome || 50,520 || 42–28 || W6
|-  style="text-align:center; background:#bfb;"
| 71 || June 22 || Yankees || 5–4 || Williams (3–0) || Howe (2–2) || Ward (19) || SkyDome || 50,513 || 43–28 || W7
|-  style="text-align:center; background:#fbb;"
| 72 || June 23 || Yankees || 3–4 || Key (9–2) || Stottlemyre (4–5) || Farr (18) || SkyDome || 50,520 || 43–29 || L1
|-  style="text-align:center; background:#bfb;"
| 73 || June 24 || Yankees || 7–2 || Hentgen (10–2) || Kamieniecki (2–2) || || SkyDome || 50,516 || 44–29 || W1
|-  style="text-align:center; background:#fbb;"
| 74 || June 25 || @ Brewers || 5–6 || Fetters (1–0) || Cox (5–3) || || County Stadium || 39,308 || 44–30 || L1
|-  style="text-align:center; background:#bfb;"
| 75 || June 26 || @ Brewers || 3–2 || Guzmán (7–1) || Eldred (9–8) || Ward (20) || County Stadium || 45,173 || 45–30 || W1
|-  style="text-align:center; background:#bfb;"
| 76 || June 27 || @ Brewers || 5–4 || Morris (5–7) || Wegman (4–13) || Ward (21) || County Stadium || 45,580 || 46–30 || W2
|-  style="text-align:center; background:#bfb;"
| 77 || June 28 || @ Orioles || 7–2 || Stottlemyre (5–5) || Sutcliffe (8–3) || Leiter (1) || Oriole Park at Camden Yards || 46,606 || 47–30 || W3
|-  style="text-align:center; background:#bfb;"
| 78 || June 29 || @ Orioles || 2–1 || Hentgen (11–2) || McDonald (4–7) || Ward (22) || Oriole Park at Camden Yards || 46,408 || 48–30 || W4
|-  style="text-align:center; background:#fbb;"
| 79 || June 30 || @ Orioles || 0–6 || Valenzuela (3–7) || Stewart (3–3) || || Oriole Park at Camden Yards || 46,409 || 48–31 || L1
|-

|-  style="text-align:center; background:#fbb;"
| 80 || July 2 || @ Royals || 2–3 || Gubicza (1–6) || Cox (5–4) || || Kauffman Stadium || 23,832 || 48–32 || L2
|-  style="text-align:center; background:#fbb;"
| 81 || July 3 || @ Royals || 2–3 || Cone (6–8) || Morris (5–8) || Montgomery (24) || Kauffman Stadium || 28,060 || 48–33 || L3
|-  style="text-align:center; background:#fbb;"
| 82 || July 4 || @ Royals || 1–3 || Haney (5–1) || Stottlemyre (5–6) || Montgomery (25) || Kauffman Stadium || 40,329 || 48–34 || L4
|-  style="text-align:center; background:#fbb;"
| 83 || July 5 || White Sox || 3–4 || Álvarez (8–4) || Hentgen (11–3) || Hernández (16) || SkyDome || 50,508 || 48–35 || L5
|-  style="text-align:center; background:#bfb;"
| 84 || July 6 || White Sox || 5–1 || Stewart (4–3) || McDowell (12–6) || || SkyDome || 50,505 || 49–35 || W1
|-  style="text-align:center; background:#fbb;"
| 85 || July 7 || White Sox || 2–5 || Fernandez (10–4) || Guzmán (7–2) || Hernández (17) || SkyDome || 50,517 || 49–36 || L1
|-  style="text-align:center; background:#fbb;"
| 86 || July 8 || Rangers || 1–6 || Rogers (6–6) || Morris (5–9) || || SkyDome || 50,525 || 49–37 || L2
|-  style="text-align:center; background:#fbb;"
| 87 || July 9 || Rangers || 2–4 || Pavlik (5–4) || Stottlemyre (5–7) || Henke (16) || SkyDome || 50,506 || 49–38 || L3
|-  style="text-align:center; background:#fbb;"
| 88 || July 10 || Rangers || 7–10 || Lefferts (2–7) || Hentgen (11–4) || Henke (17) || SkyDome || 50,508 || 49–39 || L4
|-  style="text-align:center; background:#fbb;"
| 89 || July 11 || Rangers || 6–11 || Leibrandt (9–4) || Stewart (4–4) || || SkyDome || 50,516 || 49–40 || L5
|-  style="text-align:center; background:#bbb;"
| || July 13 || N.L. @ A.L.All-Star Game (AL wins—) || 9–3 || McDowell (CWS) || Burkett (SF) || || Oriole Park at Camden Yards || 48,147 || colspan=2|Baltimore, Maryland
|-  style="text-align:center; background:#bfb;"
| 90 || July 15 || Royals || 7–2 || Leiter (5–5) || Burgos (0–1) || || SkyDome || 50,503 || 50–40 || W1
|-  style="text-align:center; background:#fbb;"
| 91 || July 16 || Royals || 3–7 || Haney (6–2) || Morris (5–10) || Montgomery (26) || SkyDome || 50,531 || 50–41 || L1
|-  style="text-align:center; background:#fbb;"
| 92 || July 17 || Royals || 4–5 || Gubicza (3–6) || Cox (5–5) || Montgomery (27) || SkyDome || 50,512 || 50–42 || L2
|-  style="text-align:center; background:#bfb;"
| 93 || July 18 || Royals || 4–3 || Hentgen (12–4) || Pichardo (4–6) || || SkyDome || 50,524 || 51–42 || W1
|-  style="text-align:center; background:#bfb;"
| 94 || July 19 || @ White Sox || 15–7 || Stewart (5–4) || Bolton (1–6) || || Comiskey Park || 40,127 || 52–42 || W1
|-  style="text-align:center; background:#fbb;"
| 95 || July 20 || @ White Sox || 1–2 || Fernandez (12–4) || Guzmán (7–3) || || Comiskey Park || 30,454 || 52–43 || L1
|-  style="text-align:center; background:#bfb;"
| 96 || July 21 || @ White Sox || 4–1 || Leiter (6–5) || Álvarez (8–6) || Ward (23) || Comiskey Park || 30,900 || 53–43 || W1
|-  style="text-align:center; background:#bfb;"
| 97 || July 22 || @ Rangers || 8–7 || Timlin (2–1) || Carpenter (0–1) || Ward (24) || Arlington Stadium || 38,198 || 54–43 || W2
|-  style="text-align:center; background:#fbb;"
| 98 || July 23 || @ Rangers || 5–6 || Lefferts (3–7) || Hentgen (12–5) || Henke (21) ||  Arlington Stadium|| 38,124 || 54–44 || L1
|-  style="text-align:center; background:#bfb;"
| 99 || July 24 || @ Rangers || 5–1 || Stewart (6–4) || Leibrandt (9–6) || Ward (25) || Arlington Stadium || 38,457 || 55–44 || W1
|-  style="text-align:center; background:#bfb;"
| 100 || July 25 || @ Rangers || 9–7 || Timlin (3–1) || Henke (4–3) || Ward (26) || Arlington Stadium || 40,277 || 56–44 || W2
|-  style="text-align:center; background:#bfb;"
| 101 || July 27 || Orioles || 6–5 || Ward (2–2) || Poole (1–1) || || SkyDome || 50,513 || 57–44 || W3
|-  style="text-align:center; background:#bfb;"
| 102 || July 28 || Orioles || 5–4 (10) || Castillo (2–0) || Williamson (5–2) || || SkyDome || 50,523 || 58–44 || W4
|-  style="text-align:center; background:#bfb;"
| 103 || July 29 || Tigers || 7–4 || Castillo (3–0) || Bolton (1–4) || Ward (27) || SkyDome || 50,528 || 59–44 || W5
|-  style="text-align:center; background:#fbb;"
| 104 || July 30 || Tigers || 5–8 || Moore (7–5) || Stewart (6–5) || Henneman (17) || SkyDome || 50,511 || 59–45 || L1
|-  style="text-align:center; background:#bfb;"
| 105 || July 31 || Tigers || 3–1 || Timlin (4–1) || Wells (10–7) || Ward (28) || SkyDome || 50,532 || 60–45 || W1
|-

|-  style="text-align:center; background:#bfb;"
| 106 || August 1 || Tigers || 2–1 || Morris (6–10) || Henneman (2–2) || || SkyDome || 50,522 || 61–45 || W2
|-  style="text-align:center; background:#bfb;"
| 107 || August 2 || @ Yankees || 4–0 || Stottlemyre (6–7) || Abbott (8–9) || Cox (2) || Yankee Stadium || 43,304 || 62–45 || W3
|-  style="text-align:center; background:#bfb;"
| 108 || August 3 || @ Yankees || 8–6 || Hentgen (13–5) || Muñoz (2–2) || Leiter (2) || Yankee Stadium || 48,031 || 63–45 || W4
|-  style="text-align:center; background:#fbb;"
| 109 || August 4 || @ Yankees || 2–6 || Kamieniecki (7–3) || Stewart (6–6) || || Yankee Stadium || 48,250 || 63–46 || L1
|-  style="text-align:center; background:#fbb;"
| 110 || August 5 || @ Yankees || 4–5 || Key (13–4) || Leiter (6–6) || || Yankee Stadium || 52,493 || 63–47 || L2
|-  style="text-align:center; background:#bfb;"
| 111 || August 6 || Brewers || 11–10 (11) || Leiter (7–6) || Henry (2–4) || || SkyDome || 50,517 || 64–47 || W1
|-  style="text-align:center; background:#fbb;"
| 112 || August 7 || Brewers || 1–7 || Miranda (1–2) || Stottlemyre (6–8) || || SkyDome || 50,506 || 64–48 || L1
|-  style="text-align:center; background:#fbb;"
| 113 || August 8 || Brewers || 2–5 || Bones (7–8) || Hentgen (13–6) || || SkyDome || 50,510 || 64–49 || L2
|-  style="text-align:center; background:#bfb;"
| 114 || August 10 || Twins || 6–3 || Stewart (7–6) || Erickson (6–14) || Ward (29) || SkyDome || 50,530 || 65–49 || W1
|-  style="text-align:center; background:#bfb;"
| 115 || August 11 || Twins || 4–2 || Guzmán (8–3) || Deshaies (11–10) || Ward (30) || SkyDome || 50,525 || 66–49  || W2
|-  style="text-align:center; background:#fbb;"
| 116 || August 12 || Twins || 2–9 || Tapani (7–11) || Morris (6–11) || || SkyDome || 50,527 || 66–50 || L1
|-  style="text-align:center; background:#fbb;"
| 117 || August 13 || @ Red Sox || 3–5 || Darwin (12–8) || Stottlemyre (6–9) || Russell (32) || Fenway Park || 34,276 || 66–51 || L2
|-  style="text-align:center; background:#bfb;"
| 118 || August 14 || @ Red Sox || 5–2 || Hentgen (14–6) || Dopson (7–8) || Ward (31) || Fenway Park || 33,924 || 67–51 || W1
|-  style="text-align:center; background:#bfb;"
| 119 || August 15 || @ Red Sox || 9–1 || Stewart (8–6) || Clemens (9–10) || || Fenway Park || 33,380 || 68–51 || W2
|-  style="text-align:center; background:#bfb;"
| 120 || August 16 || @ Indians || 4–1 || Guzmán (9–3) || Ojeda (0–1) || Ward (32) || Cleveland Stadium || 25,546 || 69–51 || W3
|-  style="text-align:center; background:#bfb;"
| 121 || August 17 || @ Indians || 6–4 || Morris (7–11) || Kramer (5–3) || Ward (33) || Cleveland Stadium || 40,253 || 70–51 || W4
|-  style="text-align:center; background:#bfb;"
| 122 || August 18 || @ Indians || 7–6 (11) || Cox (6–5) || Lilliquist (2–2) || Ward (34) || Cleveland Stadium || 24,003 || 71–51 || W5
|-  style="text-align:center; background:#fbb;"
| 123 || August 20 || Mariners || 1–4 || Johnson (13–8) || Hentgen (14–7) || || SkyDome || 50,527 || 71–52 || L1
|-  style="text-align:center; background:#fbb;"
| 124 || August 21 || Mariners || 2–5 || Fleming (9–2) || Stewart (8–7) || Power (5) || SkyDome || 50,519 || 71–53 || L2
|-  style="text-align:center; background:#bfb;"
| 125 || August 22 || Mariners || 12–7 || Guzmán (10–3) || Ontiveros (0–1) || || SkyDome || 50,511 || 72–53 || W1
|-  style="text-align:center; background:#fbb;"
| 126 || August 23 || Indians || 8–9 || Hernandez (4–2) || Eichhorn (2–1) || DiPoto (4) || SkyDome || 50,518 || 72–54 || L1
|-  style="text-align:center; background:#bfb;"
| 127 || August 24 || Indians || 8–6 || Stottlemyre (7–9) || Tavárez (2–2) || Ward (35) || SkyDome || 50,511 || 73–54 || W1
|-  style="text-align:center; background:#bfb;"
| 128 || August 25 || Indians || 10–7 || Hentgen (15–7) || Mesa (9–10) || Ward (36) || SkyDome || 50,525 || 74–54 || W2
|-  style="text-align:center; background:#fbb;"
| 129 || August 26 || @ Mariners || 3–6 || Johnson (14–8) || Stewart (8–8) || Power (6) || Kingdome || 28,463 || 74–55 || L1
|-  style="text-align:center; background:#fbb;"
| 130 || August 27 || @ Mariners || 6–7 || Nelson (4–3) || Williams (3–1) || Plantenberg (1) || Kingdome || 31,771 || 74–56 || L2
|-  style="text-align:center; background:#fbb;"
| 131 || August 28 || @ Mariners || 1–2 || Bosio (7–7) || Cox (6–6) || Power (7) || Kingdome || 56,076 || 74–57 || L3
|-  style="text-align:center; background:#bfb;"
| 132 || August 29 || @ Mariners || 6–2 || Stottlemyre (8–9) || Hanson (10–11) || || Kingdome || 34,593 || 75–57 || W1
|-  style="text-align:center; background:#bfb;"
| 133 || August 30 || @ Athletics || 4–2 || Hentgen (16–7) || Darling (5–7) || Ward (37) || Oakland–Alameda County Coliseum || 24,371 || 76–57 || W2
|-  style="text-align:center; background:#bfb;"
| 134 || August 31 || @ Athletics || 3–2 (10) || Cox (7–6) || Eckersley (2–2) || Ward (38) || Oakland–Alameda County Coliseum || 21,334 || 77–57 || W3
|-

|-  style="text-align:center; background:#bfb;"
| 135 || September 1 || @ Athletics || 8–3 || Guzmán (11–3) || Mohler (1–6) || || Oakland–Alameda County Coliseum || 24,251 || 78–57 || W4
|-  style="text-align:center; background:#fbb;"
| 136 || September 3 || @ Angels || 1–4 || Langston (15–6) || Morris (7–12) || Grahe (7) || Anaheim Stadium || 23,834 || 78–58 || L1
|-  style="text-align:center; background:#fbb;"
| 137 || September 4 || @ Angels || 2–4 || Magrane (1–1) || Stottlemyre (8–10) || Frey (12) || Anaheim Stadium || 21,530 || 78–59 || L2
|-  style="text-align:center; background:#fbb;"
| 138 || September 5 || @ Angels || 1–5 || Leftwich (2–4) || Hentgen (16–8) || || Anaheim Stadium || 19,653 || 78–60 || L3
|-  style="text-align:center; background:#fbb;"
| 139 || September 7 || Athletics || 7–11 (11) || Honeycutt (1–4) || Castillo (3–1) || || SkyDome || 50,515 || 78–61 || L4
|-  style="text-align:center; background:#fbb;"
| 140 || September 8 || Athletics || 1–2 || Witt (10–12) || Ward (2–3) || Eckersley (30) || SkyDome || 50,329 || 78–62 || L5
|-  style="text-align:center; background:#fbb;"
| 141 || September 9 || Athletics || 4–7 || Smithberg (1–0) || Castillo (3–2) || Eckersley (31) || SkyDome || 50,518 || 78–63 || L6
|-  style="text-align:center; background:#bfb;"
| 142 || September 10 || Angels || 10–4 || Stottlemyre (9–10) || Leftwich (2–5) || || SkyDome || 50,522 || 79–63 || W1
|-  style="text-align:center; background:#bfb;"
| 143 || September 11 || Angels || 9–5 || Hentgen (17–8) || Hathaway (4–3) || || SkyDome || 50,529 || 80–63 || W2
|-  style="text-align:center; background:#bfb;"
| 144 || September 12 || Angels || 4–1 || Stewart (9–8) || Finley (14–12) || Ward (39) || SkyDome || 50,523 || 81–63 || W3
|-  style="text-align:center; background:#bfb;"
| 145 || September 14 || @ Tigers || 9–5 || Guzmán (12–3) || Davis (2–7) || || Tiger Stadium || 23,674 || 82–63 || W4
|-  style="text-align:center; background:#bfb;"
| 146 || September 15 || @ Tigers || 14–8 || Stottlemyre (10–10) || Moore (12–9) || Ward (40) || Tiger Stadium || 24,526 || 83–63 || W5
|-  style="text-align:center; background:#bfb;"
| 147 || September 17 || @ Twins || 4–2 || Hentgen (18–8) || Tapani (9–15) || Ward (41) || Hubert H. Humphrey Metrodome || 24,113 || 84–63 || W6
|-  style="text-align:center; background:#bfb;"
| 148 || September 18 || @ Twins || 5–1 || Stewart (10–8) || Erickson (8–19) || Timlin (1) || Hubert H. Humphrey Metrodome || 26,415 || 85–63 || W7
|-  style="text-align:center; background:#bfb;"
| 149 || September 19 || @ Twins || 10–0 || Guzmán (13–3) || Trombley (5–5) || || Hubert H. Humphrey Metrodome || 23,775 || 86–63 || W8
|-  style="text-align:center; background:#bfb;"
| 150 || September 21 || Red Sox || 5–0 || Stottlemyre (11–10) || Clemens (11–14) || || SkyDome || 50,524 || 87–63 || W9
|-  style="text-align:center; background:#fbb;"
| 151 || September 22 || Red Sox || 5–7 (10) || Ryan (6–2) || Timlin (4–2) || || SkyDome || 50,532 || 87–64 || L1
|-  style="text-align:center; background:#bfb;"
| 152 || September 23 || Red Sox || 5–1 || Stewart (11–8) || Minchey (1–1) || || SkyDome || 50,528 || 88–64 || W1
|-  style="text-align:center; background:#bfb;"
| 153 || September 24 || Yankees || 7–3 || Guzmán (14–3) || Key (17–6) || || SkyDome || 50,517 || 89–64 || W2
|-  style="text-align:center; background:#bfb;"
| 154 || September 25 || Yankees || 3–1 || Leiter (8–6) || Tanana (0–2) || Ward (42) || SkyDome || 50,527 || 90–64 || W3
|-  style="text-align:center; background:#fbb;"
| 155 || September 26 || Yankees || 3–7 || Abbott (11–13) || Stottlemyre (11–11) || || SkyDome || 50,518 || 90–65 || L1
|-  style="text-align:center; background:#bfb;"
| 156 || September 27 || @ Brewers || 2–0 || Hentgen (19–8) || Eldred (16–16) || Ward (43) || County Stadium || 14,931 || 91–65 || W1
|-  style="text-align:center; background:#bfb;"
| 157 || September 28 || @ Brewers || 6–4 || Stewart (12–8) || Maysey (1–;2) || Ward (44) || County Stadium || 13,182 || 92–65 || W2
|-  style="text-align:center; background:#bfb;"
| 158 || September 29 || @ Brewers || 9–6 || Eichhorn (3–1) || Orosco (3–5) || Ward (45) ||  County Stadium|| 13,508 || 93–65 || W3
|-  style="text-align:center; background:#bfb;"
| 159 || September 30 || @ Orioles || 6–2 || Leiter (9–6) || Rhodes (5–6) || || Oriole Park at Camden Yards || 45,653 || 94–65 || W4
|-

|-  style="text-align:center; background:#fbb;"
| 160 || October 1 || @ Orioles || 2–7 || Valenzuela (8–10) || Stottlemyre (11–12) || || Oriole Park at Camden Yards || 45,881 || 94–66 || L1
|-  style="text-align:center; background:#fbb;"
| 161 || October 2 || @ Orioles || 4–8 || Sutcliffe (10–10) || Hentgen (19–9) || Mills (4) || Oriole Park at Camden Yards || 46,094 || 94–67 || L2
|-  style="text-align:center; background:#bfb;"
| 162 || October 3 || @ Orioles || 11–6 || Brow (1–1) || McDonald (13–14) || || Oriole Park at Camden Yards || 45,913 || 95–67 || W1
|-

Player stats

Batting

Starters by position
Note: Pos = Position; G = Games played; AB = At bats; H = Hits; Avg. = Batting average; HR = Home runs; RBI = Runs batted in

October 3, 1993: On the last day of the regular season, Roberto Alomar raised his batting average to .326, moving from fourth to third in the American League batting race; with John Olerud (.363) and Paul Molitor (.332) already first and second, respectively, this marked the first time in 100 years that the top three hitters in the league were from the same team;

Other batters
Note: G = Games played; AB = At bats; H = Hits; Avg. = Batting average; HR = Home runs; RBI = Runs batted in

Pitching

Starting pitchers
Note: G = Games pitched; IP = Innings pitched; W = Wins; L = Losses; ERA = Earned run average; SO = Strikeouts

Other pitchers
Note: G = Games pitched; IP = Innings pitched; W = Wins; L = Losses; ERA = Earned run average; SO = Strikeouts

Relief pitchers
Note; G = Games pitched; IP = Innings pitched; W = Wins; L = Losses; SV = Saves; ERA = Earned run average; SO = Strikeouts

American League Championship Series

Game 1
October 5, Comiskey Park

The ALCS opened at Comiskey Park with a battle of aces, as Toronto threw Juan Guzmán against Chicago's Jack McDowell, the eventual 1993 American League Cy Young Award winner. The game was scoreless until the top of the fourth, when Jays third baseman Ed Sprague stroked a triple to right field that scored John Olerud and Paul Molitor. The White Sox took a 3–2 lead in the bottom of the fourth with RBI base hits by Ozzie Guillén and Tim Raines, but Toronto stormed back in its half of the fifth with a two-run double by Olerud and a run-scoring single by Molitor. The Jays' designated hitter added a two-run homer in the seventh that finally chased McDowell, and the Chicago batters could muster nothing more against Toronto's bullpen as the Jays took the game 7–3 and a 1–0 lead in the series.

Game 2
October 6, Comiskey Park

In Game 2, the Jays' Dave Stewart faced off against the Sox' Alex Fernandez. Toronto struck in the first when Rickey Henderson reached on an error by Dan Pasqua and later scored on a fielder's choice by Roberto Alomar, but the Pale Hose tied the game in the bottom of the inning when Stewart walked the bases loaded and then unleashed a wild pitch, scoring Raines. The contest remained knotted at one-all until the top of the fourth, when the Jays touched Fernandez for two runs via singles by Tony Fernández and Pat Borders. As in the first game, the ChiSox could not solve Toronto's relievers, and Duane Ward (who had notched a league-leading 45 saves during the regular season) secured his first playoff save as the Jays took a 2–0 lead in the series with a 3–1 victory.

Game 3
October 8, SkyDome

The series shifted north of the border for Game 3, featuring Chicago's Wilson Álvarez taking on Toronto's Pat Hentgen. The two starters traded zeroes until the South Siders erupted with a five-run third, including a pair of two-run singles by Ellis Burks and Lance Johnson. The Blue Jays got a run in the bottom half of the frame when Henderson doubled, stole third, and scored on a Devon White single, but Hentgen was pulled in the fourth after giving up back-to-back base hits. His replacement on the mound, Danny Cox, gave up another run when a Robin Ventura sacrifice fly plated Guillén. This was more than enough for Alvarez, who went the distance as the Pale Hose cut Toronto's series lead to 2–1.

Game 4
October 9, SkyDome

In the fourth game, the ChiSox sent Jason Bere to the hill against the Jays' Todd Stottlemyre. The South Siders took a 2–0 lead in the top of the second thanks to a home run by Johnson, but Toronto came back in the third with an RBI double from Alomar and a two-run single by Joe Carter, after which Pale Hose skipper Gene Lamont yanked Bere and replaced him with Tim Belcher. Chicago reclaimed its two-run advantage in the sixth when Frank Thomas tattooed a solo homer and Johnson tripled to center, scoring Burks and Bo Jackson. In the bottom of the inning, another RBI double from Alomar cut the lead to one, but the White Sox again restored their two-run lead in the seventh with a groundout from Joey Cora that scored Guillén and then extended it to three runs in the ninth with a single by Ventura. Roberto Hernández shut the door on the Jays in the bottom half of the inning, and the series was tied at two games apiece.

Game 5
October 10, SkyDome

Game 5 was a rematch of Game 1, with McDowell facing Guzmán. In the first, Henderson doubled to left and then tried to steal third, but McDowell's throwing error resulted in Henderson coming home for a 1–0 Toronto lead. The Jays tacked on single runs in the second, third, and fourth, but Burks broke the shutout in the Chicago fifth with a solo home run. In the seventh, Scott Radinsky and Hernández came in to stop the bleeding for the ChiSox, but they combined to give up another run. In the ninth, Ward entered to close out the game and Ventura greeted him with a two-run shot, but he maintained his composure and struck out Jackson to give Toronto a 3–2 ALCS lead.

Game 6
October 12, Comiskey Park

The series returned to the Windy City for Game 6, as Stewart again faced Fernandez. In the top of the second, Borders ripped a two-run single that gave the Jays the lead, but the Pale Hose tied it in the third with a bases-loaded walk by Thomas and a fielder's choice from Ventura. In the fourth, Toronto took the lead back when Molitor reached on an error by Ventura and came home on a fielder's choice by Borders. The game stayed that way until the ninth, when White homered and Molitor cracked a two-run triple to right, giving the Jays a 6–2 lead. ChiSox reserve outfielder Warren Newson tagged Ward for a solo homer in the ninth, but the Jays closer recovered and induced a flyout from Raines, sealing the game 6–3 and Toronto's second American League pennant in a row.

World Series

Game 1
October 16, 1993, at the SkyDome in Toronto, Ontario, Canada

The series' first game sent two staff aces -- Curt Schilling for Philadelphia and Juan Guzman for Toronto—against one another. The result was less than a pitcher's duel, however, as both teams scored early and often.

The deciding plays came in the middle innings. With Toronto behind 4–3 in the 5th inning, Devon White hit a solo home run to tie the game. The next inning, John Olerud hit a solo home run of his own to put Toronto on top. Toronto added three insurance runs in the bottom of the 7th and held on to win 8–5. Al Leiter pitched 2 innings—in relief of a sporadic Juan Guzman, who walked four in just five innings—for his first World Series win. John Kruk had three hits for Philadelphia.

Game 2
October 17, 1993, at SkyDome in Toronto, Ontario, Canada

In the second game of the series, Dave Stewart was on the mound for Toronto and Terry Mulholland started for Philadelphia. Philadelphia jumped out to an early lead: in the third inning, Jim Eisenreich followed John Kruk and Dave Hollins RBI singles with a three-run home run to deep right-centre. Toronto got on the scoreboard in the fourth inning courtesy of a Joe Carter two-run home run to left (his second most important home run of the series by a wide margin), but the Jays were unable to mount a significant offensive push later in the game. Philadelphia held on to win 6–4. Terry Mulholland pitched 5 innings, allowing 3 earned runs, for the win.

Game 3
October 19, 1993, at Veterans Stadium in Philadelphia

For Toronto, Pat Hentgen faced off against Philadelphia starter Danny Jackson in Game 3. Hentgen pitched a strong 6 innings, allowing just 1 run, and the Toronto offense took care of the rest. Toronto won 10–3.

Toronto manager Cito Gaston was faced with an unusual and difficult decision prior to game time. As the series switched the National League ballpark, Gaston was forced to sit one player from his regular line-up as the designated hitter (DH) would not be allowed to play. As regular DH Paul Molitor had been a hot hand in the line-up, Gaston elected to sit firstbaseman John Olerud and place Molitor at first base. The decision was potentially controversial as Olerud led the American League in batting during the year with a .363 average and Molitor was the less sure-handed fielder. Molitor, however, put these concerns to rest, going 3 for 4, hitting a home run in the 3rd inning, and driving in 3 runs.

Game 4
October 20, 1993, at Veterans Stadium in Philadelphia

In the fourth game of the series, Todd Stottlemyre started for Toronto while Tommy Greene started for Philadelphia. The starters are notable because neither lasted three innings.

In one of the more unusual plays in World Series history, Todd Stottlemyre, trying to go first to third on a Roberto Alomar single in the 2nd inning, did a bellyflop diving into third base, where he was called out. Todd's awkward dive resulted in an abrasion on his chin and appeared to shake him up in the next inning, during which he surrendered a Lenny Dykstra two-run home run. Stottlemyre was pulled after the second inning, having already given up six runs. (Tommy Greene fared little better, being pulled after giving up seven runs in 2 innings.)

Philadelphia took a commanding 12–7 lead in the 5th inning, courtesy of two-run home runs from Darren Daulton and Dykstra, and a run-scoring double from Milt Thompson.

Toronto fought back from a 14–9 deficit in the 8th inning, scoring six runs on run scoring hits from Paul Molitor, Tony Fernández, Rickey Henderson, and Devon White. Duane Ward pitched the final 1 innings, preserving the 15–14 victory.  Three new World Series records included the longest game at four hours fourteen minutes (4:14), most runs by both clubs with twenty-nine (29), and runs scored by a losing team with fourteen (14).

Also, Charlie Williams became the first African American to serve as the home plate umpire for a World Series game.

Game 5
October 21, 1993, at Veterans Stadium in Philadelphia

The offenses were due for an off-day, and it came in Game 5 courtesy of a Curt Schilling (Philadelphia) and Juan Guzman (Toronto) pitching duel. Schilling shut down the previously unstoppable Toronto offense, limiting the team to just five hits and no runs. Guzman pitched well in a losing effort, allowing only two runs and five hits in seven innings of work.

The two runs scored as a result of scrappy play from the Philadelphia offense. In the first inning, Lenny Dykstra walked, stole second, moved to third on a Pat Borders throwing error, and scored on a John Kruk ground out. In the second inning, Darren Daulton opened with a double, took third on a ground out, and scored on a Kevin Stocker single.

Game 6
October 23, 1993, at SkyDome in Toronto, Ontario, Canada

The sixth game in the series was a rematch between Game 2 starters Terry Mulholland and Dave Stewart, who would have similar results. Toronto opened up the scoring in the bottom of the first with a run-scoring Paul Molitor triple, Joe Carter sacrifice fly, and Roberto Alomar RBI single. Molitor added a solo home run in the 5th inning, bringing the score to 5–1 for Toronto.

In the 7th inning, Philadelphia fought back with five runs to take a 6–5 lead. Lenny Dykstra hit a three-run home run, Dave Hollins had an RBI single and Pete Incaviglia hit a sacrifice fly. The inning brought an end to Dave Stewart's night, leaving the game with 6 innings pitched and 4 runs given up.

Philadelphia closer Mitch Williams came on to the pitch the bottom of the 9th with Philadelphia clinging to a 6–5 lead. After beginning the inning by walking Rickey Henderson, Williams tried to counter Henderson's speed by pitching out of a slide-step style of pitching delivery. Prior to Game 6 of the 1993 World Series, Williams never used the slide-step delivery in his career.  This may have cut back on the velocity of the hard throwing Williams.  The walk to Henderson was followed by a Devon White fly out and a single by Paul Molitor. Joe Carter came up next and, on a two strike pitch, he hit an inside pitch just over the left field fence for a three-run walk-off home run, giving the Blue Jays a come-from-behind 8–6 victory, and the World Series crown. This was the last major North American professional sports championship won by a Canadian-based team until 2019, when the Toronto Raptors, a team that was formed in 1995, defeated the two-time defending champion Golden State Warriors in a six-game NBA Finals.

Postseason Game Log

|-  style="text-align:center; background:#bfb;"
| 1 || October 5 || @ White Sox || 7–3 || Guzman (1–0) || McDowell (0–1) || || Comiskey Park || 46,246 || 1–0 || W1
|-  style="text-align:center; background:#bfb;"
| 2 || October 6 || @ White Sox || 3–1 || Stewart (1–0) || Fernandez (0–1) || Ward (1) || Comiskey Park || 46,101 || 2–0 || W2
|-  style="text-align:center; background:#fbb;"
| 3 || October 8 || White Sox || 1–6 || Álvarez (1–0) || Hentgen (0–1) ||  || SkyDome || 51,783 || 2–1 || L1
|-  style="text-align:center; background:#fbb;"
| 4 || October 9 || White Sox || 4–7 || Belcher (1–0) || Stottlemyre (0–1) || Hernández (1)  || SkyDome || 51,889 || 2–2 || L2
|-  style="text-align:center; background:#bfb;"
| 5 || October 10 || White Sox || 5–3 || Guzman (2–0) || McDowell (0–2) || || SkyDome || 51,375 || 3–2 || W1
|-  style="text-align:center; background:#bfb;"
| 6 || October 12 || @ White Sox || 6–3 || Stewart (2–0) || Fernandez (0–2) || Ward (2) || Comiskey Park || 45,527  || 4–2 || W2
|-

|-  style="text-align:center; background:#bfb;"
| 1 || October 16 || Phillies || 8–5 || Leiter (1–0) || Schilling (0–1) ||  Ward (1) || SkyDome || 52,011 || 1–0 || W1
|-  style="text-align:center; background:#fbb;"
| 2 || October 17 || Phillies || 4–6 || Mulholland (1–0) || Stewart (0–1) || Williams (1) || SkyDome || 52,062 || 1–1 || L1
|-  style="text-align:center; background:#bfb;"
| 3 || October 19 || @ Phillies || 10–3 || Hentgen (1–0) || Jackson (0–1) ||  || Veterans Stadium || 62,689 || 2–1 || W1
|-  style="text-align:center; background:#bfb;"
| 4 || October 20 || @ Phillies || 15–14 || Castillo (1–0) || Williams (0–1) ||  Ward (2) || Veterans Stadium || 62,731 || 3–1 || W2
|-  style="text-align:center; background:#fbb;"
| 5 || October 21 || @ Phillies || 0–2 || Schilling (1–1) || Guzman (0–1) ||  || Veterans Stadium || 62,706 || 3–2 || L1
|-  style="text-align:center; background:#bfb;"
| 6 || October 23 || Phillies || 8–6 || Ward (1–0) || Williams (0–2) ||  || SkyDome || 52,195 || 4–2 || W1
|-

Awards and honors

Awards

Paul Molitor would finish as the runner-up in the American League MVP voting, while John Olerud finished third. Frank Thomas won the MVP Award, having led the Chicago White Sox to the American League West division title, before they were defeated by the Blue Jays in the ALCS.

The 1993 Toronto Blue Jays received the 1994 Outstanding Team ESPY Award.
The 1993 Toronto Blue Jays were inducted into the Ontario Sports Hall of Fame in 2002.

64th MLB All-Star Game

Infielders

Outfielders

Designated Hitter

Pitchers

Manager

Coach

Farm system

References

External links
1993 Toronto Blue Jays at Baseball Reference
1993 Toronto Blue Jays at Baseball Almanac
1993 WS at Baseball-Reference
Blue Jay Way Interview

Toronto Blue Jays seasons
American League East champion seasons
American League champion seasons
World Series champion seasons
Toronto Blue Jays season
1993 in Canadian sports
1993 in Toronto